Anthemis cupaniana, called the Sicilian chamomile, is a species of flowering plant in the genus Anthemis, native to Sicily, and introduced to Great Britain and the Chatham Islands. It may have gained the Royal Horticultural Society's Award of Garden Merit as Anthemis punctata subsp. cupaniana, which may well refer to Anthemis punctata.

References

cupaniana
Endemic flora of Sicily
Plants described in 1879